Sint Maarten competed at the 2019 World Aquatics Championships in Gwangju, South Korea from 12 to 28 July.

Swimming

Sint Maarten entered one swimmer.

Women

References

Nations at the 2019 World Aquatics Championships
2019
World Aquatics Championships